Anand Agricultural University (AAU) is located in the western Indian state of Gujarat between the cities of Vadodara and Ahmedabad. This was formerly the Anand Campus of Gujarat Agricultural University, which is now  independent. It has three constituent colleges, for agriculture, veterinary science and animal husbandry and dairy science. The jurisdiction of the university covers Kheda, Anand, Ahmedabad, Vadodara, Dahod and Panchmahal districts. It was set up to provide education support to the farming community in areas such as Agriculture, Horticulture, Engineering, Information technology and Business Studies.

History 
Anand Agricultural University was previously a part of Gujarat Agricultural University, a benchmark project initiated by Sardar Vallabhbhai Patel and K.M munsi by incorporating Krushi-Go-Vidhya Bhavan or the Institute of Agriculture, in 1938. The institute was popularly known as Khetiwadi; it became part of Gujarat Agricultural University in 1972.

The B. A. College of Agriculture, established in 1947, was initially affiliated to Bombay University until 1956, followed by Gujarat University until 1962 and Sardar Patel University along with the Sheth M.C College of Dairy Science. In 1972 they became integral institutions of Gujarat Agricultural University along with the Government College of Veterinary Science and Animal Husbandry, Anand, which was established in 1964. The activities of the Anand zone of the erstwhile Gujarat Agricultural University have been transferred to the Anand Agricultural University with effect from 2004.

Centers for education 
 Bansilal Amritlal College of Agriculture, Anand
 Sheth M. C. College of Dairy Science, Anand
 College of Veterinary Science and Animal Husbandry, Anand
 College of Agricultural Engineering and Technology, Godhara
 College of Agricultural Information Technology, Anand 
 College of Food Processing Technology and Bio Energy, Anand
 College of Horticulture, Anand (Established as wing under B.A. College of Agriculture)
 College and Polytechnic of Agriculture, Vaso (Established as wing under B.A. College of Agriculture)
 College of Agriculture, Jabuagm (Established as wing under B.A. College of Agriculture)
 Sheth M. C. Polytechnic in Agriculture, Anand
 Polytechnic in Horticulture, Vadodara
 Polytechnic in Agricultural Engineering, Dahod
 Polytechnic in Food Science and Home Economics, Anand

Research centers 
 AAU Incubator, Agri & Food Business Incubator, AAU, Anand
Regional Research Station, Anand
 Bidi Tobacco Research Station, Anand
 Main Forage Research Station, Anand
 Reproductive Biology Research Unit, Anand
 Main Vegetable Research Station, Anand
 Medicinal and Aromatic Plant Research Center, Boriavi 
 Bio control Project, Anand
 Weed Control Project, Anand
 Micronutrient Project, Anand
 Animal Nutrition Research, Anand
 Center of Excellence in Agricultural Biotechnology, Anand
 AINP on Pesticide Residues, ICAR, Unit-9 
 Rice Research Station 		
 Main Maize Research Station, Godhara
 Regional Research Station, Arnej 		
 Agricultural Research Station, Dahod
 Regional Cotton Research Station, Viramgam 		
 Agricultural Research Station, Derol
 Agricultural Research Station, Dhandhuka 		
 Agricultural Research Station for Irrigated Crops, Thasra
 Pulse Research Station, Vadodara 		
 Paddy Research Station, Dabhoi
 Castor and Seed Spices Research Station, Sanand 		
 Narmada Irrigation Research station, Khandha

Extension education centers 
 School of Baking, Anand 		
 Sardar Smruti Kendra, Anand 		
 Agriculture Information Technology Center, Anand
 Centre for Communication Net work, Anand 		
 Farm Advisory Service, Anand
 Extension Education Institute, Anand 		
 Poultry Training Centre, Anand
 Mali Training Centre, Anand 
 Transfer of Technology Centre, Anand, Arnej 		
 Krishi Vigyan Kendra, Devataj (Sojitra)
 Krishi Vigyan Kendra, Arnej
 Krishi Vigyan Kendra, Dahod 		
 Tribal Training Centre, Devagadhbaria
 Tribal Training, Dahod

See also
Agricultural Universities in India

References

External links
 

Agricultural universities and colleges in Gujarat
Universities in Gujarat
Education in Anand district
Educational institutions established in 2004
2004 establishments in Gujarat